Valley Water Mill Pond is a  reservoir located just north of Springfield, Missouri. It is managed under a joint operation between the Watershed Committee of the Ozarks and the Missouri Conservation Department.

Recreation 
The reservoir is located in Valley Water Mill Park. The park has hiking trails, a conference center, and a picnic area. The reservoir has two fishing docks as well as bank access. Boating and swimming are not allowed. Fishing is allowed and common fish species that are present include largemouth bass, redear sunfish, bluegill, channel catfish, and black crappie.

History 
The original dam at Valley Water Mill was built in the 1850s, to hold water for the operation of McCracken Mill, a local grist mill. In 1957, the lake and land that became the park were purchased by the Springfield Green County parks department. In 2008, the lake and dam were re-constructed giving the reservoir a maximum depth of 14 feet. The reservoir was reopened to fishing in 2012.

References 

1850s establishments in Missouri
Lakes of Missouri
Geography of Springfield, Missouri
Reservoirs in Missouri
Bodies of water of Greene County, Missouri